Luboradza  is a village in the administrative district of Gmina Barwice, within Szczecinek County, West Pomeranian Voivodeship, in north-western Poland. It is part of the former historic village of Alt Koprieben/Coprieben (Pomerania maps dating 1891 and 1893) and became Stare Koprzywno after 1945. The village was abandoned and is now known as Luboradza.

For the history of the region, see History of Pomerania.

The village has a population of 30.

References

Luboradza